The Edmonton Drakes were a baseball team in Edmonton, Alberta, Canada. The team played in the 1950s as a part of the Big Four League.

References

Dra
Defunct minor league baseball teams
Defunct baseball teams in Canada
Baseball teams in Alberta